Naval Base Panama Canal Zone refers to a number of United States Navy bases used during World War II to both protect the Panama Canal and the key shipping lanes around the Panama Canal Zone. Bases were built and operated on the Atlantic Ocean side and the Pacific Ocean side. The main Naval Base at the Panama Canal was the Naval Station Coco Solo that had been in operation since 1918.

History
In 1821 Panama voluntarily became part of Colombia. In 1903, the United States supported the group that wanted to separate from Colombia. After Panama separated from Colombia 1903, Panama and the United States signed a treaty, the Hay–Bunau-Varilla Treaty. The treaty gave the United States right to the 553 square-mile, 10 miles wide, Panama Canal Zone, a US Territory with capital in Balboa. Construction started on 4 May 1904 and was completed on 15 August 1914. The canal opened waterway from the Atlantic Ocean to the Pacific Ocean, bypassing the Strait of Magellan. In 1939 the Panama Canal Zone was put under the Caribbean Defense Command, due to U Boat operations.  Due to Japan's aggression in China, Japan lost canal use on 22 July 1941. The Canal Zone defends were increased due to the strategic importance of the waterway. The Navy and Army grew base and built. The Navy installed anti-torpedo nets and naval mines. Bases installed smoke generators, anti-aircraft guns, long-range radar systems, searchlights, and aircraft warning stations. Troops were deployed to Colón's, Margarita Island, and Toro Point's Fort Sherman. For coast defense eleven 16-inch Naval guns were installed. The 15th Naval District was in command of the Panama Canal Zone. Two airfields operate 30 fighter aircraft, with Curtiss P-36 Hawks, and Curtiss P-40 Warhawk for protection. A seaplane base had regular submarine patrols. With all the patrols and defenses, U Boats and Imperial Japanese Navy submarines did not attack or come near the Panama Canal Zone. With the loss of the Dutch East Indies oil fields, the vast Panama Canal Zone tank farms became the fuel line for the fuel needed to fight the Pacific War. Many tankers and cargo ships were lost in the early part of the Battle of the Atlantic. To help fuel oil pipelines were built along the Panama Canal, the decreased the number of tankers needed to go through the Panama Canal. The first pipeline opened on 18 April 1943 and second pipeline opened at the end of 1943. In 1944 a diesel and separate gasoline pipeline were opened. By April 1943 the US believed the threat to the Canal had diminished, the Canal defense status was downgraded, and there was a reduction in troop bases in Panama. The Naval Bases at the Panama Canal Zone were supported during World War II and after the war by the larger Naval Base Trinidad.

Axis powers did have plans to bomb the Panama Canal. Nazi Germany had Operation Pelikan, but the plan was aborted. Japan started a plan in August 1943 to bomb the Panama Canal with plans from Submarine aircraft carriers, like the I-400-class submarines with three Seiran aircraft each. Japan trained for the Panama Canal attack. Japan canceled the plan to attack the Panama Canal in June 1945, as the war was taking a toll on Japan. The plans change to attack a closer major base, Naval Base Ulithi. Japan surrendered before Naval Base Ulithi was attacked. With the surrender, the submarine aircraft carriers were told to destroy the planes, which they sank. The three I-400-class submarines were captured by the US Navy. In 1951 to manage the Panama Canal Zone the US government start the government-owned corporation, Panama Canal Company. The Panama Canal Company operated the Panama Canal and other Canal Zone enterprises, like the Panama Railroad and the Port of Balboa until 1979. Panama Canal Company was run by a board of directors appointed by the US President. The Torrijos–Carter Treaties of 1979 ended the Panama Canal Company. The Panama Canal Zone was renamed in 1979, to the Reverted Areas as this was the start of the process of turning over the Canal Panama. The Panama Canal Zone was returned to the Republic of Panama on 1 October 1979 per the Torrijos–Carter Treaties.

Naval Bases Panama Canal Zone

Base used to protect the Panama Canal Zone in World War II:

Naval Station Coco Solo, Fleet Post Office, FPO# 1955 (1918–1999) Atlantic side
US Submarine Base Coco Solo
NAS Upham, at NAS Coco Solo, Seaplane Base, FPO# 720
Coco Solo ammunition depot
Coco Solo Naval Hospital on 41 acres, 3 miles from the Coco Solo air station, In 1954 transferred to Canal Zone Government
Naval Section base Cristobal at Cristóbal, Colón, site of the original 1918 base, WW2 troop housing
Cristobal Repair Depot two marine railways 
Cristobal Dry Dock built in 1907
 Cristobal administrative HQ for Atlantic side
Cristobal tank farm (Fort De Lesseps)
Mount Hope tank farm, Atlantic side, Colón  
Naval Base Taboga Island, PT Boat Base, FPO# 40
David Field, Naval Air Land Base, at David, Chiriquí FPO# 19, now Enrique Malek International Airport, Pacific side
Rodman Naval Station now PSA Panama International Terminal (1932–1999 on 600 acres)
Arraijan tank farm, for Rodman, Pacific side 
Arraijan Ammo depot for Rodman, Pacific side 
Port of Balboa Naval Base, Pacific side (Panama City) (1915–1999)    
Balboa 15th Naval District headquarters    
Balboa Naval Depot, at Balboa, Panama, Naval Supply Depot and Hospital, FPO#  121
Balboa Dry docks for repair
Balboa ammunition depot and Marine Barracks Panama Canal (1939–1999)
Balboa tank farm 820-acre
Balboa Naval Hospital
Balboa Fort Amador, Navy Sector at Fort Amador was 137 acres (1914–1995) (Fort Clayton)
Gatun tank farm, at Gatun Lake, 1,700 acres 

Gatun Lake floating nuclear power plant model MH-1A (1968–1976)
Camp Rousseau, Rousseau Naval Hospital on 50-acre during WW2, Atlantic side  
Almirante Fuel depot, small base at Almirante, Atlantic side.
Trans-Panama pipeline built and used in World War 2, four pipes and pumping stations.
Camp Elliott US Marines, (1904–1927) Culebra, renamed Camp Gaillard Atlantic side
Camp Otis US Marines, east of Camp Gaillard, Atlantic side 

Canal Zone Naval Radio Stations
Farfan, at Rodman Naval Station, FPO# 63 and FPO# 121, Farfan Radio Station (819 acres) Pacific side 
Toro Point, at Fort Sherman, on Limon Bay radio compass station FPO# 35 and FPO# 122, Box 30 Atlantic side
Cape Mala, FPO# 17, Radio Compass Station on Punta Mala just south of Pedasí, Los Santos
Summit, FPO# 39 and FPO# 121, Box 20, in Soberanía National Park 
Gatun, at Fort Davis at Gatun Lake, radio station FPO#  122, Box 60 (Fort Gulick)
Post World War II:
Naval Small Craft Instruction and Technical Training School (NAVSCIATTS) (1969–1999))
Galeta Island (1965–1999)
Cocoli Navy housing opened in 1952, near Cocoli Locks

Naval Station Coco Solo

Naval Station Coco Solo and Submarine Base Coco Solo was founded in 1917, near Fort Randolph, as a submarine base to protect the Canal Zone on the Atlantic Ocean side.  Starting in 1914 with five United States C-class submarines that were stationed at the base. In 1919 the C-class submarines were retired. In 1920 USS O-12, USS O-13, USS O-15, and USS O-16 arrived at the base and were retired in 1924. The USS O-5 sank after being hit by the SS Abangarez on 28 October 1923. In 1914 USS S-44 and other S-class submarines were stationed at Coco Solo till 1931. USS S-48 was stationed at the base from 1931 to 1935. USS S-43 for two-year at the base. USS S-45 at the base from 1935 to 1940. In 1940 three V-boat submarines, USS Barracuda, USS Bass and USS Bonita were stationed at Coco Solo though most of the war. Coco Solo Naval Hospital operated at the base during the war. The Navy had a major ship and submarine repair base built at Coco Solo. Submarine Base Coco Solo was also used as a training ground for new crews before being moved to more forward war action. New crews would patrol the water protecting the Canal Zone. The base was very busy during World War II: with patrols, training, refueling and repairing vessels. By 1969, Naval shipyard activity had ended. By the 1980s all Navy work was moved to The Naval Station on Galeta Island. The base closed in 1999, the site is now the Manzanillo International Terminal. US Senator John McCain was born in 1936 at the small Navy hospital at Coco Solo Naval Air Station.

NAS Coco Solo

NAS Coco Solo had a small runway, three plane hangars, one blimp hangar, three seaplane ramps and tank farm. During the war the base added an engine test depot, a large aircraft assembly depot and a large repair depot. A new runway was built next to the Army runway. Seaplane unit VP-1 was transferred to NAS Coco Solo on 10 October 1943 operating under FAW-3.

NAS Upham
NAS Upham also called NAS Coco Solo was a seaplane base of the US Navy. Named after Admiral Frank B. Upham. NAS Upham seaplanes did U Boat patrols over the Antilles, the Caribbean, and coasts of South America. The base flew Glenn L. Martin PM-2 seaplane founded on 1 September 1931 as VP-5S. The Naval unit based at NAS Upham was FAW-3. The PM-2 seaplane was an older design from the 1930s Naval Aircraft Factory PN. The PM-2 seaplanes were replaced by Consolidated P2Ys retired in 1941. The P2Y was replaced by the Consolidated PBY Catalinas used till the end of the war. While the US did not enter World War II until 1941, On 8 September 1939, President Franklin D. Roosevelt issued a proclamation of a limited" national emergency. Part of the proclamation stated "neutrality patrols". The "neutrality patrols" were flown out of NAS Guantanamo Bay, Cuba, San Juan, Puerto Rico and NAS Coco Solo in Panama. Naval Seaplane Unit VP-33, known as Wings over Panama, was trained and sent to base for patrols. In 1941 anti submarine bombing was add to the training and the unit was designated VP-32. After the bombing of Pearl Harbor the VP-32 at NAS Upham started patrolling the Pacific Ocean around the Panama Canal for Empire of Japan vessels also. In early 1942 NAS Upham had 28 PBY seaplanes with planes added from VP-52 and VP-81. NAS Upham had convoy escort duty added to its anti-submarine patrols. Later in the war the larger and newer Martin PBM Mariner seaplanes were added to NAS Upham. Martin PBM had a bombing rack and in July 1943 three German U Boats were sunk after being found with the newer ASG radar. The U Boats sunk were: U-159 south of Haiti; U-759 east of Jamaica; and U-359 south of Puerto Rico. VPB-32 transferred to NAS Norfolk on 8 July 1944 and patrolled the Atlantic seaboard.

PT Boat Base Taboga Island
PT Boat Base Taboga Island on Taboga Island in the Gulf of Panama was opened in 1942 at Pacific Canal entrance, under Panama Sea Frontier. An Advance base and PT boat base were built in 1942 and completed in 1944. The base had 47 PT boats and 1,200 troops stationed at the base. The Navy built a PT Boat overhaul depot at Taboga Islandm with two small marine railways and a PT Boat training base. The base had a torpedo workshop, and munitions storage depot. At its peak the base had 47 PT boats and 1,200 troops. After the crew was trained and the PT Boat completed sea trails, they would be sent to other US Naval Advance Bases. Seebees Detachment 1012 worked at the base. The base had a recreation camp was on nearby Morro Island. The PT Boat base was supported from Balboa Naval Supply Depot. The base was 20 km (12.4 miles) from Panama City, closed in March 1946. Taboga Island was included in the original 1903 treaty, Hay–Bunau-Varilla Treaty. The current Taboga Hotel was the PT-boat base barracks

Rodman Naval Station

Rodman Naval Station was founded in 1932 and construction was completed in 1937. Rodman Naval Station was across from Port of Balboa on the west side of the Canal, on the Pacific side near Panama City. (Rodman Naval Station is named after Commander-in-Chief of the US Pacific Fleet from 1919 to 1921, Admiral Hugh Rodman ( 6 January 1859 – 7 June 1940). Rodman was also the Marine Superintendent of the Panama Canal Zone in 1914. The east bank of the canal, Port of Balboa had become crowded, so the new base was built across the other side.. The Commander in Chief (Commander-in-Chief) of the United States Atlantic Fleet, Southern Detachment (CINCLANTFLT Detachment South) had its headquarters seat at Rodman Naval Base. For World War II a large fuel depot was built and started operation in 1943, fueling ships in the Panama Canal. A ship repair depot was built at the base with 3 dry docks. The base was turned over to Panama on March 11, 1999. Rodman Naval Station included the Ordnance Department, Marine Barracks, the Lacona housing, Camp Rousseau and the Cocoli housing. The base is now called Vasco Nuñez de Balboa Naval Base.

Balboa Naval Yard and Base

At the Port of Balboa, Balboa Terminal, Panama Canal Zone, the Navy had three dry docks for ship repair, Balboa Naval Depot, Balboa Naval Hospital, Balboa ammunition depot, 820-acre tank farm, refueling docks, net depot-weaving, large refrigerator storehouse and the Marine Barracks Panama Canal. The 15th Naval District headquarters was based Balboa on 65 acres. 
Before 1914, the Balboa was a marsh, before the US Navy took over the port, the site was developed by the Army Corps of Engineers during the Panama Canal construction. The 1914 Panama Canal Administration Building at Balboa seats on a hill overlooking the port, called Balboa Heights. Administration Building as extensive Canal art displays and the Goethals Monument. The Canal Zone Library and Museum opened in 1914 to showcase the Panama Canal construction. The largest Dry Dock, No. 1, completed in 1916, was able to repair battleships. The dry docks were used to repair some of the ships damaged in the Attack on Pearl Harbor in 1941. Port of Balboa was opened as the French Port La Boca, (the mouth) the US Navy renamed the port Port Ancon, after Ancon Hill, at the start of the Panama Canal construction, opening the port in 1909. In 1915, a US Navy VLF transmission station opened that radioed commands to US submarines based at Port of Balboa. The Navy also docked ships at Flamenco Island about 4 miles south of Port of Balboa. Flamenco Island is connected to the mainland by the Amador Causeway. The Amador Causeway was made from rock from the Canal construction. The Balboa drydocks became part of Astilleros Braswell International and now MEC Balboa Dry Docks Panama. Dry dock construction started in 1915. Work on drydock No. 2 was stopped in 1915, and not started again till January 1942. Once completed Drydock No. 2 could drydock two destroyers or two submarines at the same time. By the end of 1943, the Balboa Naval Yard was about the same size and capacity as Navy Yard Pearl Harbor at the end of 1941. For part of the dry Dock's history, since it opened in 1917, the dry dock was available for commercial ship repair.A 1921 rate card quotes a fee of 15 cents ($2.50 in 2022 dollars) per ton for dry docking and undocking, with a minimum charge. In 1920 the rate was 25 cents per ton ($3.59 in 2022). Six vessels were drydocked in 1920, of these two were subs USS R-25 and USS R-24, the other cargo ship, like the SS Katrina Luckenbach, also the yacht Carnegie. One of the first ship built at Balboa was the United States Navy patrol vesse, USS Pequeni in 1917.
The Dry docks, also called graving dock, gates were the same as those used on the canal: 
Dock No. 1:  318 m   by  39 m, gate entrance 33.6 m max draft  1.75 m,   
Dock No. 2:  130 m by 30.5 m gate entrance 25.9 m max draft 1.75 m    
Dock No. 3:  70 m by 16.8 m gate entrance 16.8 m max draft 1.46 m 

Fort Amador
At Balboa was Fort Amador, Navy Sector at Fort Amador was 137 acres. The Fifteenth Naval district headquartered was stationed at Fort Amador. At the fort was the Balboa Naval Radio Station built in 1914.

Naval Communications Station Balboa
Naval Communications Station Balboa (NAVCOMMSTA BALBOA) opened in 1908. The Communications Station headquarters was next to the Fifteenth Naval District headquarters, the Naval part of Fort Amador. At the communications station, the Navy had a control center, a Naval cryptographic center and a fleet radio broadcast station. The Navy had a large receiver station at Farfan on the Atlantic side. A large Naval transmitter station was built at Summit, the high point on the Trans-Isthmian Highway. Summit had six 600-foot antennas. At Gatun was the VLF transmitter for submarines Communications. The bases were part of the Inter-American Naval Telecommunications Network. The Communications Station Balboa closed in 1999.

Farfan Housing Community near the 820-acre Farfan radio station, built in 1942, the Navy built a housing community in 1947 and 1948. Farfan Housing Community was built to support the growing base. At the Community 78 houses were built, called the Farfan reservation property.

Seabees

US Navy Seabees started working in the Canal Zone in 9 September 1942. Seabee Maintenance Unit 555 arrived in December 1943 and relieved the 1942 group. Seabee both did construction and operated power plants, shore batteries, tank farm, did maintenance work and more.

Command
Canal Command:
1916 – Temporary Headquarters in an Isthmian Canal Commission building (Panama Canal Department 1917 to 1947)
1920 to 1941 – Panama Canal Department at Quarry Heights at Ancon Hill
1941– to 1947 – Caribbean Defense Command
1947 to 1963 – US Caribbean Command (and Latin America)
1963-1997– US Southern Command (COMUSNAVSO) 
1997 closed and moved to Naval Station Mayport in Miami, Florida on September 27, 1997. 
Bases transferred to Panama 11 January 1998.

Naval Command
1918 to 1993 Balboa Fort Amador Naval Headquarters
1940 to 1941, the Fifteenth Naval District Headquarters building in Bryan Hall.
1997 closed and moved to Naval Station Mayport

The US Navy worked with the Panama Canal Zone (1917–1979) in operation at the Panama Canal, especially the Port of Balboa (also called Port Ancon), which they shared.
Fleet support
The Naval Base Panama Canal Zone baes are the only bases that supported all the Fleets of the US Navy. Panama Canal is the bridge linking the Fleets:
 United States Fleet Forces Command (formerly Atlantic Fleet)
 United States Pacific Fleet 
 United States Naval Forces Central Command
 United States Naval Forces Europe - Naval Forces Africa
Past Fleets:
 United States First Fleet
 United States Eighth Fleet
 United States Ninth Fleet
 United States Eleventh Fleet
 United States Twelfth Fleet
 United States Asiatic Fleet historic
 United States Navy reserve fleets
 Great White Fleet nickname for the Atlantic Fleet sent around the world by President Theodore Roosevelt in 1908
 East India Squadron
 European Squadron
 North Atlantic Fleet
 Mediterranean Squadron
 Scouting Fleet
 South Atlantic Squadron

Commander in Chief
On November 6, 1906, Theodore Roosevelt was the first president to depart the continental United States on an official diplomatic trip. Roosevelt made a 17-day trip to Panama and Puerto Rico. Roosevelt checked on the progress of the Canal's construction and talked to workers about the importance of the project. In Puerto Rico, he recommends that Puerto Ricans should become U.S. citizens. Roosevelt traveled to Panama on the US Navy ship the USS Louisiana. Theodore Roosevelt on May 6, 1904 had appointed John Findley Wallace, formerly chief engineer and finally general manager of the Illinois Central Railroad, as chief engineer of the Panama Canal Project. The project was completed by General George Washington Goethals on August 15, 1914.
 
Following Roosevelt, President Taft visited the Panama Canal a few times in 1907, 1909, 1910 and 1912. Taft traveled to the Canal on the US Navy USS Tennessee (ACR-10) and the battleship USS Arkansas (BB-33).

Airbases
NAS Coco Solo, Atlantic side
NAS Upham Seaplane Base, Atlantic side
Coco Solo Field – Coco Walk- France Field, opened in 1917, then France AFB, then Colon Airport in 1949, then 1999 to Enrique Adolfo Jiménez Airport, Atlantic side
Howard Field Pacific side (1941–1999) with Fort Kobbe, now Panamá Pacífico International Airport
David Field US Navy and Army, now Enrique Malek Airport, Pacific side
Albrook Field, Pacific side (was Balboa Fill Landing Field) (1922–1997) now Albrook "Marcos A. Gelabert" International Airport
Rio Hato Field, now Scarlett Martínez International Airport
Anton Field abandoned
Aguadulce Field, abandoned

Gallery

See also

 US Naval Advance Bases
 Panama Railway
 Rail transport in Panama
 Transcontinental Railroad#Panama
 List of former United States military installations in Panama
 Tivoli Hotel, Panama
 Gorgas Hospital
 Panama–Pacific International Exposition
 Ajax crane barge
 Canal Zone
 Corozal American Cemetery and Memorial
 Fleet problem series of naval exercises at the base

External links
youtube.com Panama Canal Dry Dock
youtube.com The Coco Solo Hospital

References

Ports and harbours of Panama
Panama Canal
Naval Stations of the United States Navy
Military installations established in 1917
Panama Canal Zone